Erhan Can Kartal (born 19 December 1998) is a Turkish actor who is known for portraying young Şehzade Bayezid in the TV series Muhteşem Yüzyıl.

Early life and career 
He began his career in 2010 in the Turkish TV series Ezel. In 2012, he acted in the film Kayıp and appeared in Beyaz Show. The same year, he was named Best Child Model in Turkey. He was featured in the series Medcezir in the role of Kadir.

He became better-known after acting in the 2013 TV series Muhteşem Yüzyıl in the role of Şehzade Bayezid, the fifth son of Suleiman the Magnificent, the brave child who loved adventure, freedom, and challenge.

Filmography

Awards and nominations

References

External links 
 

21st-century Turkish male actors
1998 births
Living people
Models from Istanbul
Turkish male models
Male actors from Istanbul